The Council of Three Fires (in , also known as the People of the Three Fires; the Three Fires Confederacy; or the United Nations of Chippewa, Ottawa, and Potawatomi Indians) is a long-standing Anishinaabe alliance of the Ojibwe (or Chippewa), Odawa (or Ottawa), and Potawatomi North American Native tribes.

History
Originally one people, or a collection of closely related bands, the ethnic identities of Ojibwe, Odawa, and Potawatomi developed after the Anishinaabe reached Michilimackinac on their journey westward from the Atlantic coast. Using the Midewiwin scrolls, Potawatomi elder Shup-Shewana dated the formation of the Council of Three Fires to 796 AD at Michilimackinac.

In this Council, the Ojibwe were addressed as the "Older Brother," the Odawa as the "Middle Brother," and the Potawatomi as the "Younger Brother."  Consequently, whenever the three Anishinaabe nations are mentioned in this specific and consecutive order of Ojibwe, Odawa, and Potawatomi, it is an indicator implying Council of Three Fires as well.  In addition, the Ojibwe are the "keepers of the faith," the Odawa are the "keepers of trade," and the Potawatomi are the designated "keepers/maintainers of/for the fire" (boodawaadam), which became the basis for their name Boodewaadamii (Ojibwe spelling) or Bodéwadmi (Potawatomi spelling).

Though the Three Fires had several meeting places, Michilimackinac became the preferred meeting place due to its central location.  From this place, the Council met for military and political purposes.  From this site, the Council maintained relations with fellow Anishinaabeg nations, the Ozaagii (Sac), Odagaamii (Meskwaki), Omanoominii (Menominee), Wiinibiigoo (Ho-Chunk), Naadawe (Iroquois Confederacy), Nii'inaawi-Naadawe (Wyandot), and Naadawensiw (Sioux). Here, they also maintained relations with the Wemitigoozhi (Frenchmen), Zhaaganaashi (Englishmen) and the Gichi-mookomaanag (the Americans).

Through the totem-system and promotion of trade, the Council generally had a peaceful existence with its neighbours.  However, occasional unresolved disputes erupted into wars.  Under these conditions, the Council notably fought against the Iroquois Confederacy and the Sioux. During the French and Indian War and Pontiac's War, the Council fought against Great Britain; and during the Northwest Indian War and the War of 1812, they fought against the United States.  After the formation of the United States of America in 1776, the Council became the core member of the Western Lakes Confederacy (also known as "Great Lakes Confederacy"), joined together with the Wyandots, Algonquins, Nipissing, Sacs, Meskwaki and others.

Treaties

With Great Britain
Treaty of Fort Niagara (1764) – as part of the Western Lakes Confederacy.

With the United States
Treaty of Fort Harmar (1789) – implied
Treaty of Greenville (1795) – implied
Treaty of Fort Industry (1805) – not implied, though all 3 nations present
Treaty of Detroit (1807) – not implied, though all 3 nations present
Treaty of Brownstown (1808) – implied
Treaty of Springwells (1815) – implied
Treaty of St. Louis (1816)
Treaty of Fort Meigs (1817) – not implied, though all 3 nations present
Treaty of Chicago (1821) – not implied, though all 3 nations present
First Treaty of Prairie du Chien (1825) – implied, as well as individually with the Ojibwe and Odawa.
Second Treaty of Prairie du Chien (1829)
Treaty of Washington (1836) with the Ojibwe and Odawa
Treaty of Chicago (1833) – all 3 nations party to treaty

See also
Mackinaw City, Michigan

Notes

External links
 Confederacy of Three Fires: A History of the Anishinabek Nation

Anishinaabe groups
Anishinaabe culture
Odawa
Ojibwe
Potawatomi
Former confederations
Native American history of Michigan